Fung Ka Hoo (born 13 August 1997) is a Hong Kong cyclist, who currently rides for UCI Continental team .

Major results

2013
 National Novice Road Championships
1st  Road race
1st  Time trial
2014
 2nd Time trial, National Junior Road Championships
2015
 1st Time trial, Asian Junior Road Championships
 1st  Time trial, National Junior Road Championships
2016
 National Road Championships
1st  Under-23 time trial
2nd Time trial
 2nd Time trial, Asian Under-23 Road Championships
2017
 1st  Time trial, National Under-23 Road Championships
 2nd Overall Tour of Fuzhou
2018
 Asian Road Championships
2nd Under-23 time trial
3rd Team time trial
 2nd Overall Tour of Quanzhou Bay
2020
 3rd Overall Cambodia Bay Cycling Tour

References

External links

1997 births
Living people
Hong Kong male cyclists
Cyclists at the 2018 Asian Games
Asian Games competitors for Hong Kong